Aoma or AOMA may refer to 

Association of Algerian Muslim Ulema, cultural and religious organisation in Algeria
Ivbiosakon language, also known as the Aoma language
A boat built by the Logan Brothers